Q is the seventeenth letter of the English alphabet.

Q may also refer to:

People
 Q, pseudonym of Sir Arthur Quiller-Couch, the Cornish writer
 Q, pseudonym used by the originator of QAnon, an American far-right conspiracy theory
 Q, pseudonym of Quentin Elias in his appearances in gay porn site Randy Blue
 Q, stage name for Qurram Hussain of JoSH
 Q, stage name for Q Marsden
 Q, nickname for NBA assistant coach Bruce Fraser
 Q, or Q Martel, nicknames of Giffard Le Quesne Martel
 Q, nickname for Joel Quenneville
 Q, nickname of Qaushiq Mukherjee, an Indian film director
 Q, nickname of Quincy Jones
 Q, nickname of American basketball player Quintin Dailey (1961–2010)
 Q, nickname of former American football player Anquan Boldin
 Q, main dancer and vocalist of South Korean boy band The Boyz
 Maggie Q (born 1979), American actress
 Schoolboy Q, rapper
 Stacey Q, disco singer
 Brian "Q" Quinn, member of the American comedy troupe The Tenderloins

Arts, entertainment, and media

Fictional entities  
 Q (James Bond), a character in the James Bond novels and films
 Q (Star Trek), a character and the name of the character's species
 Q (Street Fighter), a character from the video game series Street Fighter
 Q, an amnesiac child from the video-game Zero Time Dilemma
 Quinton "Q" Brooks, a character from the TV series Moesha
 Ah Q, the main character in the novella The True Story of Ah Q
 The Q, a character from the TV series The Lost Islands
 Kyu, a character in the dating simulation videogame HuniePop

Literature
 Q (magazine), British music magazine
 Q Awards, yearly music awards given by Q magazine
 Q (novel), historical novel by Luther Blissett first published in Italian in 1999
 Q source, also known as Q document, a hypothetical early Gospel writing (Bible)
 "Q" Is for Quarry, the seventeenth novel in Sue Grafton's "Alphabet mystery" series, published in 2002

Music 
 Q (1970s band), an American disco group
 SSQ (band), formerly Q, an American synth-pop band
 Q (album), Japanese language album by Mr. Children, 2000
 Q, jazz album by Tom Hasslan's Krokofant
 "Q" (song), by Mental Cube (The Future Sound of London), 1990
 "Q", a song by AAA, 2006

Networks, stations, and channels 
 Q (TV network), Philippine network previously known as Quality TeleVision (QTV)
 ARY Qtv, a Pakistani television channel
 Q Radio, a UK radio station run by Q magazine
 Q Television Network, an American cable television network
 Q TV, a UK music channel based on Q magazine

Other titled works
 Q (1982 film), horror film written and directed by Larry Cohen (Also known as Q – The Winged Serpent)
 Q (2011 film), French film
 q (radio show), CBC Radio One show, formerly called Q
 Q (TV series), Spike Milligan's BBC2 comedy series that ran between 1969 and 1983
Q, the production code for the 1965 Doctor Who serial The Space Museum

Business and government
 Q (dairy), Norwegian dairy brand
 Q clearance, United States Department of Energy security clearance
 Q Score, in marketing, way to measure the familiarity of an item
 Q Theatre, a theatre in London, England
 Q-telecom, Greek operator
 Motorola Q, smartphone released in 2006
 Pentax Q, mirrorless interchangeable lens camera released in 2011
 Tobin's q, a financial ratio developed by James Tobin

Computing and computer games 
 Q (cipher), encryption algorithm
 Q (emulator), open-source x86 emulator for Mac OS X
 Q (equational programming language), functional programming language based on term rewriting
 Q (game engine), 3D middleware from Qube Software
 Q (number format), fixed-point number format built into certain computer processors
 Q (programming language from Kx Systems), array processing language
 Q (software), a computer software package for molecular dynamics simulation
 Q Sharp (Q#), domain-specific programming language
 Q, a channel service in QuakeNet's IRC services
 Panasonic Q, a hybrid video game console between a GameCube and a DVD player, manufactured by Nintendo and Panasonic
 Q Entertainment, developer of Rez HD and the Lumines and Meteos games
 Q-Games, developer of the Pixel Junk series of PlayStation 3 games

Engineering 
 Q, the standard abbreviation for an electronic transistor, used e.g. in circuit diagrams
 Q the first moment of area, used in calculating shear stress distributions
 Q, the reactive power component of apparent power
 Q Factor (bicycles), the width between where the pedals attach to the cranks
 Q factor or Q in resonant systems, a measurement of the effect of resistance to oscillation

Linguistics 
 Voiceless uvular stop in the International Phonetic Alphabet
 Abbreviation for Question

Mathematics 
  or Q, set of all rational numbers
 Q, the Quaternion group
 Q, Robinson arithmetic, a finitely axiomatized fragment of Peano Arithmetic
 Q value in statistics, the minimum false discovery rate at which the test may be called significant

Science

Biology and chemistry 
 Q, the symbol for discharge (hydrology)
 q, an abbreviation for "every" in medicine
 Q, abbreviation for the amino acid, glutamine
 Q, abbreviation for quinone
 q, designation for the long arm of a chromosome
 Q, reaction quotient
 Cardiac output (Q), the volume of blood pumped by each ventricle per minute
 Coenzyme Q, a carrier in electron transport 
 Haplogroup Q (mtDNA), a human mitochondrial DNA (mtDNA) haplogroup
 Haplogroup Q-M242 (Y-DNA), a Y-chromosomal DNA (Y-DNA) haplogroup
 Q value (nuclear science), the differences of energies of the parent nuclides to the daughter nuclides

Physics and astronomy 
 Q or q, dynamic pressure
 Max q
 Q, electric charge
 q, elementary charge
 Q, Fusion energy gain factor
 Q, heat
 q, momentum transfer
 Q, quasar
 q, quecto-, a metric prefix of 10-30
 Q, quetta-, a metric prefix of 1030
 Q, Toomre's Stability Criterion
 Q, volumetric flow rate
 q, quark

Sports 
 Great Southern Bank Arena, formerly JQH Arena, a nickname for the arena on the campus of Missouri State University
 Q (San Jose Earthquakes mascot), furry blue mascot of the Major League Soccer team San Jose Earthquakes
 San Diego Stadium, later Qualcomm Stadium, a nickname for a stadium in San Diego, California
 Quebec Major Junior Hockey League, often referred to as "The Q"
 Q, a nickname for Rocket Mortgage FieldHouse, Cleveland, Ohio; from the arena's previous name, Quicken Loans Arena

Transportation
 Q (New York City Subway service)
 Q-ship, converted merchant vessels with concealed armament intended to lure and destroy submarines

Other uses 
Q Society of Australia, right-wing, anti-Islamic political society
 Q, a nickname for Chuluaqui-Quodoushka, a series of New Age sexual meditation exercises developed by Harley Reagan
Quintals, an archaic method of measuring crop yield, was often abbreviated as q
 Quarter, as in "Q1", "Q2", "Q3" and "Q4", a three-month period in a calendar year
Q. texture, a Taiwanese term describing the ideal texture of many foods
Initiative Q, a new payment network and digital currency devised by Saar Wilf
Quebec, the military time zone code for UTC−04:00
Sky Q, a subscription-based television and entertainment service
The Q (nightclub), an LGBT nightclub in New York City

See also 
 Cue (disambiguation)
 Kyū, rank, in Japanese martial arts and other Japanese grading systems
 QQ (disambiguation)
 QQQ (disambiguation)
 QQQQ (disambiguation)
 Queue (disambiguation)
 Suzie Q (disambiguation)